Friedrich Gruber (born 14 July 1968) is an Austrian sailor. He competed in the Star event at the 1992 Summer Olympics.

References

External links
 

1968 births
Living people
Austrian male sailors (sport)
Olympic sailors of Austria
Sailors at the 1992 Summer Olympics – Star
Sportspeople from Klagenfurt